The following are the winners of the 5th annual ENnie Awards, held in 2005:

References

External links
 2005 ENnie Awards

 
ENnies winners